Sima is a Chinese family name. It is one of the rare two-character Chinese family names; most Chinese family names consist of only a single character. It is an occupational surname, literally meaning "control" (sī) "horses" (mǎ); in a similar way as the English surname Marshall is derived from the Frankish: "mare" (horse) + "skalkoz" (master).  The family name originated from one of the offices of the Three Excellencies of the Zhou dynasty. The name has also been anglicised as "Szema".

History
The Sima clan were said to be the descendants of the mythological figures Gaoyang and Chongli (Gaoyang's son). They served as xiaguan (夏官; "officers of summer") in the reigns of the mythical emperors Yao and Shun and through the Xia and Shang dynasties. During the Zhou dynasty, officials holding the appointment of xiaguan oversaw military affairs and were collectively known as "xiaguan sima". Cheng Boxiufu (程柏休父), a descendant of Chongli, helped King Xuan of the Zhou dynasty consolidate his rule over his kingdom. In return, the king awarded aristocratic status to Cheng Boxiufu's clan. Cheng Boxiufu and his descendants adopted Sima as their family name. In the late Zhou dynasty, the Sima clan migrated to the states of Wei, Zhao and Qin. The Sima family in Qin included Sima Ji, a general who battled alongside Bai Qi during the Battle of Changping. His fifth-generation descendant was Sima Tan, a Han dynasty court astrologer, and his son was Sima Qian, the author of Records of the Grand Historian.

In the late Qin dynasty, Sima Ang served as a general in the insurgent Zhao state and joined other rebel forces in overthrowing the Qin dynasty. After the fall of the Qin dynasty, Sima Ang declared himself the king of a separate state, Yin (殷), with its capital in Henei (河內; in present-day Henan). In the early Han dynasty, Sima Ang's kingdom became a commandery of the Han Empire and his descendants had lived there since. Sima Yi, a descendant of Sima Ang, served as an official, military general and regent of the Cao Wei state in the Three Kingdoms period. His grandson, Sima Yan, usurped the throne from the last Cao Wei emperor and established the Jin dynasty. After the Jin dynasty ended, many members of the Sima clan changed their surname to avoid persecution.

List of people with the surname
 Cheng Boxiufu, first took the title Sima as his surname 
 Sima Niu, disciple of Confucius
 Sima Cuo, important Qin General  
 Sima Shang, General of the State of Zhao
 Sima Xin, Qin dynasty official and general, later King of Sai.
 Sima Ang, Qin dynasty official, later King of Yin
 Sima Tan, historian during the Western Han dynasty 
 Sima Qian, Sima Tan's son, historian during the Western Han dynasty and author of Records of the Grand Historian
 Sima Xiangru, a minor official during the Western Han dynasty but better known for his poetic skills, Chinese wine (jiu) business and controversial marriage to a widow Zhuo Wenjun after both eloped.
 Sima Lang, Sima Yi's elder brother, Han dynasty politician.
 Sima Fu, Sima Yi's younger brother, Cao Wei politician.
 Sima Yi, Cao Wei regent, general and politician.
 Sima Shi, Sima Yi's eldest son, Cao Wei general and regent.
 Sima Zhao, Sima Yi's second son, Cao Wei general and regent.
 Sima Wang, Sima Fu's son, Cao Wei politician. 
 Sima Liang, Sima Yi's fourth son, first among the Eight Princes 
 Sima Wei, fifth son of Emperor Wu of Jin, second among the Eight Princes
 Sima Lun, Sima Yi's youngest son, third among the Eight Princes 
 Sima Jiong, son of Sima You, fourth among the Eight Princes
 Sima Yan, Sima Zhao's son, founding emperor of the Jin dynasty (266–420).
 Sima Ai, sixth son of Emperor Wu of Jin, fifth among the Eight Princes
 Sima Ying, 16th son of Emperor Wu of Jin, sixth among the Eight Princes
 Sima Yong, Sima Fu's grandson, seventh among the Eight Princes
 Sima Yue, cousin of Emperor Wu of Jin, eighth among the Eight Princes
 Sima Guang, historian and statesman during the Song dynasty, known for his monumental historical work Zizhi Tongjian and rivalry against contemporary Wang Anshi. There is a popular story of him, as a youth, saving someone who fell into a large water pot by smashing it with a rock.
 Sima Zhong, second emperor of the Jin dynasty
 Sima Chi, third emperor of the Jin dynasty
 Sima Ye, fourth emperor of the Jin dynasty
 Sima Rui, fifth emperor of the Jin dynasty and founder of the Eastern Jin dynasty
 Sima Shao, sixth emperor of the Jin dynasty
 Sima Yan, seventh emperor of the Jin dynasty
 Sima Yue, emperor of the Jin dynasty
 Sima Dan, emperor of the Jin dynasty
 Sima Pi, emperor of the Jin dynasty
 Sima Yi, emperor of the Jin dynasty
 Sima Yu, emperor of the Jin dynasty
 Sima Yao, emperor of the Jin dynasty
 Sima Dezong, emperor of the Jin dynasty
 Sima Dewen, last emperor of the Jin dynasty
 Sire Ma, Hong Kong actress from Chongqing born with the surname Sima.
 Sima Nan, Chinese scholar, journalist, social commentator.
 Sima Pingbang, Chinese scholar, social commentator.

See also
 Jin dynasty (266–420)
 Records of the Grand Historian
 Family tree of Sima Yi
 Chinese emperors family tree (early)#Jin Dynasty and Chu

Notelist

References

 Fang, Xuanling. Book of Jin (Jin Shu).

Chinese-language surnames
Individual Chinese surnames